Massignano is a comune (municipality) in the Province of Ascoli Piceno in the Italian region Marche, located about  southeast of Ancona and about  northeast of Ascoli Piceno.

Massignano borders the following municipalities: Campofilone, Cupra Marittima, Montefiore dell'Aso, Ripatransone.

Demographic evolution

References

Cities and towns in the Marche